The 2008 Men's EuroFloorball Cup Qualifying rounds took place over 13 to 31 August 2008 in three different host nations. The winner of each group advanced to the 2008 Men's EuroFloorball Cup Finals, where they had a chance to win the EuroFloorball Cup for 2008. A total of 18 teams played in the qualifying round, all from different countries.

The 2008 EuroFloorball Cup marks the second year in which the new name for the tournament was used (previously known as the European Cup). The tournament also marks its 16th year.

The IFF decided that the tournament will revert to its original format, and will take place during one calendar year, instead of two.

Qualification Format
Since the top 4 nations at the 2007–08 Men's EuroFloorball Cup were from Sweden, Finland, Switzerland, and the Czech Republic, the top team in that country automatically qualify, as well as the reigning champion. 5 teams in total receive automatic qualification.

Since 5 of the 8 spots are filled, the other 3 need to be decided using regional qualification. In Group C, the runners-up to the top team in Sweden, Finland, Switzerland, and the Czech Republic play for a spot in the finals. In the 2007–08 EuroFloorball Cup, both the top team in Sweden and the runners-up automatically qualified for the tournament, and therefore Group C consisted of 3 teams instead of 4. In Groups A and B, the teams are split into regions: West Europe and East Europe, respectively. The winning team in each group advances to the finals, making the total number of teams eight.

To be eligible to take part in the 2008 Men's EuroFloorball Cup, teams that take place in regional qualification must capture the national title in floorball in their country. If that team does not register, then the 2nd place team can register, and so forth.

Qualifying Venues
Group A qualifications for Western Europe will take place in Frederikshavn, Denmark from 13 to 17 August 2008.
Group B qualifications for Eastern Europe will take place in Bratislava, Slovakia from 27 to 31 August 2008.Group C qualifications will take place in Helsinki, Finland from 22 to 24 August 2008.

Frederikshavn, Denmark

Group A

Conference A

Conference B

Playoffs

Semi-finals

Bronze-medal match

Championship Match

Placement matches

5th-place match

Bratislava, Slovakia

Group B

Conference A

Conference B

Playoffs

Semi-finals

Championship Match

Placement matches

7th-place match

5th-place match

Note: A third place/bronze-medal match was not played due to a scheduling conflict

Helsinki, Finland

Group C

External links
2008 Men's EuroFloorball Cup Finals Switzerland – Schedule & Statistics
2008 Men's EuroFloorball Cup Qualifying Denmark – Schedule & Statistics
2008 Men's EuroFloorball Cup Qualifying Slovakia – Schedule & Statistics
2008 Men's EuroFloorball Cup Qualifying Finland – Schedule & Statistics

EuroFloorball Cup
Mens Eurofloorball Cup Qualifying, 2008